The Americas Zone was one of three zones of regional Federation Cup qualifying competition in 1993.  All ties were played at the Palmas del Mar in Humacao, Puerto Rico on hard courts.

The eighteen teams were divided into two pools of four and two pools of five to compete in round-robin matches. After each of the ties had been played, the teams that finished first and second in each of the respective pools would then move on to the play-off stage of the competition. The four teams that won a play-off match would go on to advance to the World Group.

Pool Stage
Date: 19–23 April

Play-offs

Date: 24 April

References

 Fed Cup Profile, Paraguay
 Fed Cup Profile, Colombia
 Fed Cup Profile, Guatemala
 Fed Cup Profile, Peru
 Fed Cup Profile, Trinidad and Tobago
 Fed Cup Profile, Bolivia
 Fed Cup Profile, Costa Rica
 Fed Cup Profile, Chile
 Fed Cup Profile, Venezuela
 Fed Cup Profile, Ecuador
 Fed Cup Profile, Jamaica
 Fed Cup Profile, Mexico
 Fed Cup Profile, Uruguay
 Fed Cup Profile, El Salvador

See also
Fed Cup structure

 
Americas
Tennis tournaments in Puerto Rico
Federation Cup